Hotel Room (Spanish: Cuarto de hotel) is a 1953 Mexican drama film directed by Adolfo Fernández Bustamante and starring Lilia Prado, Roberto Cañedo and Sara Guasch.

The film's art direction was by Edward Fitzgerald.

Main cast
 Lilia Prado as Consuelo Vázquez  
 Roberto Cañedo as Miguel Barrera  
 Sara Guasch as Sarita  
 Quintín Bulnes as Pocaluz  
 Guillermo Álvarez Bianchi as Don Eladio  
 Carolina Barret as Flora  
 Gilberto González as El chueco  
 Roberto Y. Palacios as Don Roberto, jefe chino  
 Maty Huitrón as Bailarina  
 Salvador Quiroz as Hombre robado 
 Jaime Jiménez Pons as Ezequiel  
 María Gentil Arcos as Panchita  
 Joaquín Roche as Agente de policía  
 Roberto Meyer as Cliente libidinoso hotel  
 Víctor Alcocer as Mariachi

References

Bibliography 
 Emilio García Riera. Breve historia del cine mexicano: primer siglo, 1897-1997. Instituto Mexicano de Cinematografía, 1998.

External links 
 

1953 films
1953 drama films
Mexican drama films
1950s Spanish-language films
Films directed by Adolfo Fernández Bustamante
Mexican black-and-white films
1950s Mexican films